Conus colombi is a species of sea snail, a marine gastropod mollusc in the family Conidae, the cone snails, cone shells or cones.

These snails are predatory and venomous. They are capable of "stinging" humans.

Description

Distribution

References

  E. Monnier & L. Limpalaër (2012): Dauciconus colombi (Gastropoda: Conidae) a New Species from Martinique - Visaya Vol. 3 n°5.
 Puillandre N., Duda T.F., Meyer C., Olivera B.M. & Bouchet P. (2015). One, four or 100 genera? A new classification of the cone snails. Journal of Molluscan Studies. 81: 1-23

External links
 To World Register of Marine Species
 

colombi
Gastropods described in 2012